RPR may refer to:

Computing
 RPR FOM, a distributed computer simulation standard

Science
 RPR problem diagnosis, to find the cause of IT problems
 RPRD2 gene, which encodes the KIAA0460 protein
 RprA RNA, a gene
 Flopristin or RPR 132552A, an antibiotic
 Rapid plasma reagin, a screening test for syphilis

Politics
 Rally for the Republic, or Rassemblement pour la République, a defunct French political party
 Republican Party of Russia – People's Freedom Party, or RPR-PARNAS, a Russian  political party
 Romanian People's Republic or Republica Populară Romînă, 1947-1965

Transportation
 Swami Vivekananda Airport, India, IATA code
 Redlands Passenger Rail, previous name of Arrow, California, United States

Other
 Registered Professional Reporter, a US certification
 Resilient Packet Ring or IEEE 802.17, a data traffic protocol

See also